Neal Brown (February 24, 1861 – September 18, 1917) was an American lawyer, politician, businessman, and writer.

Born in Fort Atkinson, Wisconsin, Brown graduated from the University of Wisconsin Law School.

Brown practiced law in Wausau, Wisconsin and was involved with the paper, railway, electric, and insurance industries. Brown also was a writer. He wrote: "The Comedy of History," "The Paper Industry and The Tariff," "Critical Confessions," and "Songs by Neal Brown."

Brown was a Democrat. He served in the Wisconsin State Assembly in 1891 and then in the Wisconsin State Senate from 1893 to 1897.  Brown was a candidate for U.S. Senate in 1903.

Brown died in Watkins Glen, New York while undergoing treatment for a heart problem.

Notes

19th-century American politicians
Businesspeople from Wisconsin
Wisconsin lawyers
Writers from Wisconsin
Democratic Party Wisconsin state senators
1861 births
1917 deaths
People from Fort Atkinson, Wisconsin
Politicians from Wausau, Wisconsin
University of Wisconsin Law School alumni
19th-century American businesspeople
19th-century American lawyers
Democratic Party members of the Wisconsin State Assembly